John Preston Walker (16 May 1892 — 27 July 1916) was an Australian rules footballer who played with St Kilda in the Victorian Football League. He was killed while on active service in France during World War I.

Family
The son of William Henry Walker (1860-1949), and Florance Maud Walker, née Williams, John Preston Walker was born at North Brighton, Victoria on 16 May 1892.

Education
He was educated at the Melbourne Grammar School. He played in the school's First XVIII in 1908 and 1909. He was captain of the school's First XI in 1908.

At the combined public schools sport meeting held at the Melbourne Cricket Ground on 3 May 1906, Walker tied for first place in the Under-14 High jump, with a leap of 4 ft 5in (135 cm), which broke the existing record.

Cricket
A batsman/wicketkeeper, he played one District Cricket match for the St Kilda Cricket Club's First XI in the 1909-1910 season (1 innings 0 runs; 2 stumpings), and eight matches for the East Melbourne Cricket Club's First XI in the 1911-1912, 1912-1913, and 1913-1914 seasons (6 catches, 3 stumpings; 9 innings, 178 runs, highest score 61 runs).

Football

St Kilda (VFL)
He played in four First XVIII matches with St Kilda. His first match was in the final round of the 1910 season, against Carlton on 3 September 1910 in which St Klda 5.6 (36) defeated Carlton 2.12 (24) — it was St Kilda's only win for the season.

He also played three games in the 1911 season.

Dandenong Football Club (DBDA)
After leaving St Kilda, he played with the Dandenong Football Club in the Dandenong and Berwick District Association in 1913 and 1914.

Military service
He enlisted in the First AIF on 4 January 1915, and left Australia on 14 April 1915 on the HMAT Wiltshire. He served with the 8th Australian Infantry Battalion in Gallipoli and France, and was promoted to Sergeant on 2 May 1916.

Death
He was killed (instantly) in action during the Battle of Pozières on 27 July 1916. Buried that evening in a shell-hole, he has no known grave.

He is commemorated at the Villers–Bretonneux Australian National Memorial, and at the Melbourne Grammar School Honour Roll.

On Monday, 28 August 1916, the Dandenong Town Hall flag was flown at half mast; and, on Saturday, 2 September 1916, in their match against the Navy Office, the Dendenong Patriotics players wore armbands out of respect for the late Sergeant Jack Walker, recently killed in France.

See also
 List of Victorian Football League players who died in active service

Footnotes

References
 Holmesby, Russell & Main, Jim (2007). The Encyclopedia of AFL Footballers. 7th ed. Melbourne: Bas Publishing.
 World War One Embarkation Roll: Private John Preston Walker (1825), in the collection of the Australian War Memorial.
 John Preston Walker (1825), photograph (accession number DA085250) in the collection of the Australian War Memorial.
 John Preston Walker (1825), photograph (accession number DA08249) in the collection of the Australian War Memorial.
 World War One Service Record: Sergeant John Preston Walker (1825), National Archives of Australia.
 World War One Nominal Roll: Private John Preston Walker (1825), in the collection of the Australian War Memorial.
 Roll of Honour: Sergeant John Preston Walker (1825), Australian War Memorial.
 Australian Casualties: 206th and 207th List Issued: Killed in Action: Victoria, The Argus, (Thursday, 7 September 1916), p.4.
 Potter, J., "Star Destroyed by War", Star Journal, 26 April 2015.

External links
 
 
 Sergeant John Preston Walker (1825), Commonwealth War Graves Commission.

1892 births
1916 deaths
People educated at Melbourne Grammar School
Australian rules footballers from Melbourne
St Kilda Football Club players
Dandenong Football Club players
Australian military personnel killed in World War I
People from Brighton, Victoria
Military personnel from Melbourne